Mathew Anim Cudjoe (born 11 November 2003) is a Ghanaian footballer who currently plays as a midfielder for Scottish Premiership side Dundee United and the Ghana National under-20 team.

Cudjoe began his career with Ghana Division Two team Young Apostles. He went on to play for Ghana Premier League sides Asante Kotoko and Legon Cities.

Club career

Youth career 
Cudjoe started his career with Great Somas in Accra till he transferred to Sunyani based a Division Two club Young Apostles, managed by Ghanaian football administrator Samuel Anim Addo. Samuel Anim Addo is also Cudjoe's manager and football agent, he happens to be the Manager of Ghanaian Striker Asamoah Gyan as well. Cudjoe was scouted and later signed up by Addo after he had competed in the maiden edition of the BabyJet U-16 tournament at the Asamoah Gyan Sports Complex in Accra Academy. He scored 6 goals at the end of the tournament, scoring a hattrick in one of the matches, to help his team win the tournament. He also ended the tournament as the top goalscorer and was crowned the overall best player. Cudjoe made his first team debut for Dundee United in a 1/1 draw with Hibernian on April 2, 2022 when he came on as a sub and immediately made an impression

Asante Kotoko (loan) 
Cudjoe signed by Asante Kotoko in December 2019 on a season-long deal. On 22 December 2019, he won his first trophy with the club, after Asante Kotoko defeated their rivals Hearts of Oak by 2–1 victory in the President's Cup. He made his professional league debut in the Ghana Premier League on 1 January 2020 at the age of 16 years in a match against Legon Cities FC, coming on as a substitute in the 84th minute replacing Emmanuel Gyamfi. In a match against rivals Hearts of Oak on 24 January 2020, Cudjoe was brought on as a substitute with the match in a 1–1 draw stance, when he was brought on, he was fouled in the penalty box which drew a penalty that was scored by Naby Keita in the 90th minute to help the team win 2-1 as the end of the match. He scored his debut Ghana Premier League goal in a home match against Ebusua Dwarfs, helping Asante Kotoko to secure a 2–0 victory. He played 6 matches and scored 1 goal as the 2019–2020 season came to an abrupt end due to the COVID-19 pandemic. After his loan deal ended Asante Kotoko tried to sign him on a long-term deal but the deal fell through and no agreement was made. He became a fan favourite during his time at the club.

Legon Cities (loan) 
Cudjoe was signed on season long loan deal by Accra-based team, Legon Cities FC. He was signed as part of the signing deal of Asamoah Gyan. He was not unveiled as part of the teams new players unveiling session but was later unveiled on his 17th Birthday on 11 November 2020 via the club's social media handles.

Dundee United 
On 17 November 2021, Scottish Premiership team Dundee United announced the signing of Cudjoe subject to international clearance, upon approval of his Visa application. Cudjoe made his first team debut for Dundee United in a 1-1 draw with Hibernian on 2 April 2022 when he came on as a substitute. Cudjoe made his first start on 9 May in a league game against Rangers.

International career 
Cudjoe was a member of the Ghana national under-20 football team at the 2019 African Games. He started in the final match of the group stage against Mali as Ghana lost by 4-2 and were eliminated from the competition. He was also a member of the  Black Satellites at the WAFU B U-20 Championship in 2020. He played in all matches at the tournament helping the team to finish as champions of West Africa Zone B and qualify for the 2021 Africa U-20 Cup of Nations.

Career statistics

Club

Honours 
Asante Kotoko

President's Cup: 2019

Ghana U20
 Africa U-20 Cup of Nations: 2021
 WAFU Zone B U-20 Tournament: 2020

References

External links 

 Mathew Anim Cudjoe unveiled
 Asamoah Gyan tips BabyJet U-16 tournament star Mathew Cudjoe for greatness
 Talent Tavern: Great Somax wonder kid Mathew Kudjo emerges star at Baby Jet U16 tourney

2003 births
Living people
Ghanaian footballers
Association football midfielders
Ghana Premier League players
Asante Kotoko S.C. players
Ghana under-20 international footballers
Ghana youth international footballers
Dundee United F.C. players
Legon Cities FC players